Léon Coeckelberg (1882 – 1950) was a Belgian cyclist. He competed in three events at the 1908 Summer Olympics.

References

External links
 

1882 births
1950 deaths
Belgian male cyclists
Olympic cyclists of Belgium
Cyclists at the 1908 Summer Olympics
Cyclists from Brussels